North Dakota held two statewide elections in 2016: a primary election on Tuesday, June 14, and a general election on Tuesday, November 8. In addition, each township elected officers on Tuesday, March 15, and each school district selected a date between April 1 and June 30 to hold their elections. This would have been the first election since the state legislature revoked the ability to use a student or military ID to satisfy state ID voting requirements, but a court ruling in August struck the down the provision, and the election was held under the 2013 rules.

Primary Election
On Tuesday, June 14, North Dakota voters decided which candidates for statewide and legislative office would appear on their ballot. In addition, voters were faced with the decision whether to ratify a single initiative, which was passed by the legislature, but referred to statewide vote via petition.

Measure 1
On March 27, 2015, a committee of members led by officers of North Dakota Farmers Union filed an unsigned petition with the North Dakota Secretary of State, allowing the group to gather signatures with the intent to place the item on the June ballot. On June 16, 2015, the committee returned with 19,354 valid signatures, well above the 13,452 required.

On the June 14 Primary Ballot, voters were asked to approve or deny the bill, given the following explanation:

General Election
On Tuesday, November 8, North Dakota voters selected the state's three presidential electors, one United States Senator, one United States Representative, Governor, Lieutenant Governor, and several other statewide executive and judicial branch offices. Voters who live in even-numbered legislative districts also selected their representatives to the North Dakota House of Representatives and North Dakota Senate. Finally, voters approved only one of the five ballot petitions that have received enough signatures to be placed on the ballot.

United States President and Vice President 

North Dakota voters chose three electors to represent them in the Electoral College via a popular vote. Voters selected the electors representing the Republican candidates, businessman Donald Trump and Indiana Governor Mike Pence, over their Democratic rivals, former Secretary of State Hillary Clinton and Senator Tim Kaine.

United States Senator 

Voters selected whom to send to Class III of the United States Senate. The incumbent, Republican John Hoeven, defeated Democratic-NPL state representative Eliot Glassheim by a wide margin.

United States House of Representatives 

Voters selected a representative to the United States House of Representatives. Incumbent Republican Representative Kevin Cramer defeated Democratic-NPL American Indian activist Chase Iron Eyes.

Governor and Lieutenant Governor 

The Republican team of businessman Doug Burgum and Watford City mayor Brent Sanford defeated the Democratic-NPL candidates, state representative Marvin Nelson and state senator Joan Heckaman in the race to replace retiring incumbent Governor Jack Dalrymple and Lieutenant Governor Drew Wrigley.

State Auditor 

In the election for State Auditor, voters selected Republican accountant Josh Gallion to replace retiring incumbent Bob Peterson over frequent Libertarian Party candidate Roland Riemers.

State Treasurer 
In the State Treasurer election, Republican incumbent Kelly Schmidt defeated the Democratic-NPL challenger, state senator Tim Mathern.

Insurance Commissioner 
In the race for Insurance Commissioner, voters selected the Republican candidate, Greater North Dakota Chamber executive Jon Godfread, over the Democratic-NPL candidate, educator Ruth Buffalo, to replace incumbent commissioner Adam Hamm, who declined to run for a third term.

Public Service Commissioner 
Voters were given the opportunity to fill one of the three seats on the Public Service Commission, selecting Republican incumbent Julie Fedorchak over Democratic-NPL rival Marlo Hunte-Beaubrun.

Superintendent of Public Instruction 
In the nonpartisan election for Superintendent of Public Instruction, voters selected incumbent Kirsten Baesler, who had been endorsed by the Republican Party, over educator Joe Chiang, who had not been endorsed by any statewide party.

Supreme Court Justice 
Two seats on the North Dakota Supreme Court were up for election in 2016: a regularly scheduled election to a full ten-year term, in which Jerod Tufte and Robert Bolinske competed to replace retiring Justice Dale Sandstrom, and a special election to serve the final two years of the term of retired Justice Mary Muehlen Maring, in which Lisa K. Fair McEvers ran unopposed.

References

External links
 

 
North Dakota